Bogoria may refer to:
Lake Bogoria in Kenya
Gmina Bogoria, a municipality in central Poland
Bogoria, Poland, the chief village in the above municipality
Bogoria, Sandomierz County in Świętokrzyskie Voivodeship (south-central Poland)
the Bogoriowie, a family of Polish knights
Bogorya, a Polish heraldic coat of arms
Bogoria (plant), a genus of orchids